The AutoNation National Team of the Week is a weekly award given by the Football Writers Association of America (FWAA) to an American College Football team to honor that team's win and performance. Beginning in 2002, the members of the FWAA began naming a National Team of the Week. In 2004, the award first started being sponsored by the Tostitos Fiesta Bowl.  In 2014, Big Game replaced Tostitos Fiesta Bowl as the presenting sponsor for the National Team of the Week.  In 2015, AutoNation became the presenting sponsor.

Members of the FWAA board of directors and All-America committee decide the weekly honor. Each Monday during the college football regular season at 4pm ET, the FWAA will name the AutoNation National Team of the Week.

The very first recipient of the award was Duke, following their 23-16 victory over East Carolina to open the 2002 season, which ended the Blue Devils' 23-game losing streak.  Since then, four teams have been given the honor at least three times, the most of any teams: Miami, Michigan State, Notre Dame, and Southern California. Only one team, Miami, has received the award twice in one season (2002), and only once has the award been shared amongst two teams (Texas and Oklahoma State in 2008).

Award recipients

See also 
Grantland Rice Award

References

External links
The Associated Press Top 25 College Football Poll at Sports Illustrated
The Associated Press Top 25 Men's College Basketball Poll at Sports Illustrated
List of all Final AP Poll results and champions
Weekly AP football polls from 1936-present

Poll
Fiesta Bowl
College football awards